Kieran Wright (born 1 April 1999) is a Scottish footballer who plays as a goalkeeper for Scottish Premiership side Rangers and the Scotland national under-21 team.

He has previously played on loan for Gala Fairydean Rovers, Albion Rovers, Raith Rovers, Alloa Athletic, Partick Thistle and Dumbarton. He has also played for Scotland at under-17 and under-19 levels.

Club career
Wright started his career at Rangers, he signed a professional contract with the club in March 2016, lasting until 2018.

In August 2016, he joined Gala Fairydean Rovers on loan until the end of the year. His loan was later extended until the end of the season, with him winning the club's Player's Player of the Year and Young Player of the Year awards for the 2016–17 season.

He joined Albion Rovers on loan until the end of the month on 4 January 2018. He made his debut for the club on 27 January 2018 in a 3–1 defeat to Stranraer. He extended his loan to the end of the season on 31 January. In February 2018, he extended his contract with Rangers. He appeared in twelve league matches for Alloa Athletic.

In August 2018, he joined Raith Rovers on loan until the end of December. He made his debut for the club on 4 August 2018 in a 1–1 draw with Stranraer. He made seven league appearances for Raith Rovers.

In December 2019, he signed a new deal with the club, lasting until summer 2021. On 30 January 2020, he joined Scottish Championship side Alloa Athletic on loan until the end of the season. He made his debut for Alloa on 1 February 2020 in their 1–1 Scottish Championship draw with Inverness Caledonian Thistle. He played four times for Alloa in the Scottish Championship during the 2019–20 season.

On 27 August 2020, he joined Scottish League One side Partick Thistle on a season-long loan. He made 15 appearances on loan at the club. After a one game emergency loan spell at Alloa Athletic in November 2021, Wright joined fellow Scottish League One side Dumbarton on loan until the end of the season in January 2022.

International career
He has played for Scotland at under-17, under-19 and under-21 levels.

Career statistics

Honours

Club

Partick Thistle
Scottish League One: 2020–21

References

External links

2000 births
Living people
Scottish footballers
Association football goalkeepers
Rangers F.C. players
Gala Fairydean Rovers F.C. players
Albion Rovers F.C. players
Raith Rovers F.C. players
Alloa Athletic F.C. players
Partick Thistle F.C. players
Dumbarton F.C. players
Scottish Professional Football League players
Scotland youth international footballers
Scotland under-21 international footballers